Couto Misto was an independent microstate on the border between Spain and Portugal. It was composed of the villages of Santiago de Rubiás, Rubiás (now in the Spanish municipality of Calvos de Randín), and Meaus (now in the Spanish municipality of Baltar), all in the Salas Valley, Ourense, Galicia. The territory of the Couto Misto also included a small uninhabited strip now part of the Portuguese municipality of Montalegre.

As a result of complex medieval manorial relations, this land eluded both Portuguese and Spanish control for centuries, actually operating as a sovereign state in its own right until the 1864 Treaty of Lisbon that partitioned the territory between Spain (which annexed most of the land including the three villages) and Portugal (which remained with a smaller uninhabited strip of land). As a de facto independent country, the inhabitants of the Couto Misto had many privileges, including exemption from military service and taxes, and could grant asylum to outsiders and deny access to any foreign military contingent.

Origins

Even though the origins of the Couto Misto remain unclear, the name of this territory is revealing. The term couto (coto in Spanish) comes from the Latin cautēs ("pointed rock"), which refers generally to an area demarcated with boundary stones (cautos lapideos). The term initially referred to the stones used to mark the boundaries of a given  territory, but in the Middle Ages it was used to refer to a special set of territories which, under the feudal system, were exempt from the authority of the king, holding a special economic, political, and judicial regime. The special jurisdiction of the coutos was maintained through custom and given privileges, sustaining truly independent states within its boundaries that were defended by guards (couteiros).

The adjective misto, meaning "mixed" or "joint", probably refers to the dual manorial links of this territory with the feudal lords from the Duchy of Braganza and the earldom of Monte-Rei. Another interpretation, sustained by oral traditions and by some medieval documents (where the terms mystigos or místicos meaning mystical are used), links the origin of the Couto with the legend of a pregnant fugitive princess, allegedly (Saint) , who found refuge in the villages of this territory and who was to give birth to (Saint) Rudesind Guterri, granting privileges to its inhabitants in gratitude. This explanation may well be based on historical facts, as Ilduaria Eriz, one of the most important Galician aristocrats of the late 9th/early 10th century, held the regions of Limia, where the Couto is located, and also what today is northern Portugal, under her rule. Also, the location of Rudesind's birth has actually been placed in the Salas Valley.

Several historians have dated the origins of the Couto in the same period as the emergence of the Kingdom of Portugal, somewhere around the 12th century, which is supported by documents that date back to the early 14th century. Initially the Couto was under the jurisdiction of Piconha Castle (originally Portuguese, but now within Spanish territory), but it eventually became tied to the noble houses of Braganza and Monte-Rei. With the extinction of coutos in Portugal, initiated in 1692, and concluded in 1790, the Couto Misto was freed from its feudal ties, functioning as a de facto independent state up to its partition and annexation in 1868.

Privileges
The privileges of Couto Mixto included nationality, taxes, military service, the right to bear arms, official postage stamps, self-government, right of asylum, fairs and markets, road rights of way and crops.

Current status

As the three villages of the Couto Misto are now separated in two different municipalities, the main reminder of the Couto Misto in the area are the common land community trusts that continue to function in each of the villages under the old system of popular assembly. This common land represents most of the territory of the former Couto Misto. The trusts also maintain the claim of rights of common over the strip of land formerly part of the Couto Misto and now part of the Portuguese municipality of Montalegre. A complex legal case over a wind farm on the disputed strip was settled with Enersis, a multinational electric power corporation, with a compensation of €140,000 toward the trusts. Income from the common land trusts has had significant importance in community development over the past decades.

Outside interest in the Couto re-emerged in the mid-1990s, leading to new research and subsequent academic publications. A joint summer program was organized by the University of Vigo and the University of Trás-os-Montes and Alto Douro in 1999 focusing on the history of the Couto. In 1998, the nonprofit Asociación de Amigos do Couto Mixto (Couto Misto Friendship Association) was established, followed in 2003 by the Asociación de Veciños do Couto Mixto (Couto Misto Community Association). Both organizations have reestablished the figure of the Homens de Acordo, with one person representing each village, and that of the Juiz Honorário (Honorary Judge) who is named each year in a ceremony held in the Church of Santiago. The Chest of the Three Keys has also been restored with each of the keys being kept in the custody of the current Homens de Acordo.

Political moves regarding the Couto Misto have led to debates and resolutions in the Galician, Spanish and European Parliaments. In May 2007, a motion (Proposición no de ley) was discussed and approved (with 303 votes in favour) by the Spanish Parliament recognizing the singularity of the Couto Mixto as a historical and cultural enclave, and calling for measures that allow for the social and economic development of the territory. At the same time, a similar motion was approved by the Galician Parliament, also recognizing the historical singularity of the Couto. In 2008, a written question was presented at the European Parliament regarding the European Union's contribution to the revival of the Couto Mixto, defined as an "institution which was politically and administratively independent of the Spanish and Portuguese crowns". In 2016, a request was made for the inhabitants of the Couto to be granted Portuguese and Spanish dual citizenship following the earlier case of Olivenza.

See also
Delfim Modesto Brandão
Flag of the Couto Misto
List of historical unrecognized states
Microstate

References

Further reading
Books
 
 
 
 
 
 
 
 

Articles
 López Mira, Álvaro Xosé (2008). "O Couto Mixto: Autogoberno, fronteiras e soberanías distantes," in Madrygal, 11: 35-39.
 Rodríguez Cruz, José (2006). "O Couto Mixto. Lendas de tradición Oral," in Lethes, 7: 28-33.
 Hernández Figueirido, José Ramón (2006). "Couto Mixto, poboacións promiscuas e xeografía ecleasiástica," in Lethes, 7: 34-48.
 López Mira, Álvaro Xosé (2005). "A crise do estado en zonas fronteirizas: estudo de caso do Couto Mixto como modelo sociopolítico alternativo ao estado," in Pereira Menaut, Antonio Carlos and Rojo Salgado, Arjimiro, Eds., Multiconstitucionalismo e multigoberno: Estados e rexións na Unión Europea. Santiago de Compostela: Universidade de Santiago de Compostela, pp. 177–184.
 Campos, Xosé Maria (2003). "O Couto Misto: a que puido ser a Andorra Galega," in Alborada, December 2003: 48-49.
 Seara, Eliseu (2002). "O Couto Misto de Rubiás," in Revista Aqvae Flaviae, 28: pp. 41–70
 Ledo Cabido, Bieito, Ed. (2002). "Couto Mixto," in Enciclopedia Galega Universal. Vigo: Ir Indo .
 López Mira, Álvaro Xosé (2001). "O dereito de participación política dos cidadáns do Couto Mixto," in Grial, 152: 575-579.
 García Mañá, Luís Manuel  (2001). "Couto Mixto, unha república esquecida," in Tempo Exterior, 3 .
 Morais, Maria João Moreira de (2000). "Os povos promsíscuos e o Couto Misto na raia transmontana/ourensana," in Kremer, Dieter, Ed., Actas do VI Congreso Internacional de Estudos Galegos. Trier: Universität Trier, pp. 861–867.
 Costa, João Gonçalves da (1968). "O Couto Misto de Rubiás," in Montalegre e terras de Barroso: notas históricas sobre Montalegre, freguesias do concelho e Região de Barroso. Montalegre: Câmara Municipal de Montalegre, pp. 132 and ss.

External links
 "Galegos de Cá e de Lá" documentary, 2008
  Asociación de Amigos do Couto Mixto
  Asociación de Veciños do Couto Mixto
  Los Privilegios del Coto Mixto
 European Parliament Question on the EU contribution to the revival of the Couto Mixto
  Proposición non de lei sobre a divulgación do valor histórico e o desenvolvemento cultural e social do Couto Mixto (07/PNP-0335/20500)
  Proposición no de Ley relativa al reconocimiento de la singularidad del Couto Mixto como enclave Histórico-Cultural (162/000507)
 La 'república independiente' del Couto
 Os novos xuíces honorarios darán pulo ás tradicións culturais do Couto Mixto
 Un Couto de cultura

1864 disestablishments
Former countries on the Iberian Peninsula
History of Galicia (Spain)
History of Portugal by polity
States and territories established in the 12th century
Territorial disputes of Spain
Territorial disputes of Portugal
Montalegre
Former countries